William Stansbury Thompson (born December 1, 1963) is an American former professional basketball player who played in the National Basketball Association and other leagues. He spent a 5-year career with the Los Angeles Lakers and Miami Heat, and registered one minute of court time with the Golden State Warriors in late 1991.

School and college
Thompson played basketball at Camden High School in New Jersey, where he was a two-time high school All-American. During his time with the team, Camden took the group IV state championship in 1982. Thompson was considered the number one high school prospect in the land. He elected to play college basketball for Denny Crum at the University of Louisville. His team reached the semi-finals of the national championship his freshman year, where they lost to the University of Houston. In his junior year he led the Cardinals in scoring, rebounding and assists. His senior season the Cardinals won the 1986 NCAA national championship.

NBA
In the 1986 NBA Draft he was selected 19th overall by the Atlanta Hawks. In a draft-day trade he was sent to the Los Angeles Lakers. He was a reserve on the Lakers teams that won back-to-back NBA championships in 1986–87 and 1987–88. He is one of only four players to have won an NCAA championship and an NBA championship in back to back seasons, the other three being Bill Russell (University of San Francisco 1956, Boston Celtics 1957), Henry Bibby (UCLA 1972, New York Knicks 1973) and Earvin Johnson (Michigan State 1979, Los Angeles Lakers 1980).

After an injury-riddled sophomore season with the Lakers, he was then left unprotected in the 1988 NBA expansion draft and was selected by the Miami Heat, where he was a starter for the Heat's inaugural game and averaged 10.8 points per game in Miami's expansion season. As a part-time starter in 1989–90, Thompson averaged 11 points per game. He also appeared in the 1990 NBA Slam Dunk Contest, where he finished seventh out of eight participants.

Personal life and work abroad
In 1994 Thompson went to play professional basketball in Turkey for Fenerbahçe. He then played in Israel for Hapoel Jerusalem from 1994 to 1997. Along with Israeli star Adi Gordon, Thompson led Hapoel to two State Cup titles for the first time in Israeli history, defeating Israeli and European powerhouse Maccabi Tel Aviv both times. Thompson is one of the most favored foreign basketball players ever to play in Israel.

Thompson is a born-again Christian and presently pastors Jesus People Proclaim Int'l Church in Deerfield Beach, Florida with his wife of 30 years, Cynthia.  They have 5 children and 7 grandchildren, as well as 1 great grandchild.

References

External links
College & NBA stats @ basketballreference.com
 http://www.jpproclaim.org/

1963 births
Living people
African-American basketball players
American expatriate basketball people in Argentina
American expatriate basketball people in Israel
American expatriate basketball people in Turkey
American men's basketball players
Atlanta Hawks draft picks
Basketball players from Camden, New Jersey
Camden High School (New Jersey) alumni
Fenerbahçe men's basketball players
Golden State Warriors players
Hapoel Jerusalem B.C. players
Israeli Basketball Premier League players
Los Angeles Lakers players
Louisville Cardinals men's basketball players
McDonald's High School All-Americans
Miami Heat expansion draft picks
Miami Heat players
Parade High School All-Americans (boys' basketball)
Peñarol de Mar del Plata basketball players
Rapid City Thrillers players
Small forwards
Universiade medalists in basketball
Universiade silver medalists for the United States
Medalists at the 1985 Summer Universiade
American expatriate basketball people in the Philippines
Philippine Basketball Association imports
San Miguel Beermen players
21st-century African-American people
20th-century African-American sportspeople